Tomás Herrán y Mosquera (September 21, 1843 – 1904), a Colombian diplomat, signed and became a namesake of the Hay–Herrán Treaty of 1903.

Herrán was the son of Pedro Alcántara Herrán and the maternal grandson of Tomás Cipriano de Mosquera, who both served as President of Colombia.

Herrán graduated from Georgetown University with a B.A. in 1863 and an M.A. in 1868.  He was awarded a Doctor of Laws by Georgetown in 1900.

At the time of the Hay–Herrán Treaty, Herrán served as Colombian chargé d'affaires in the United States of America. Herrán's papers were later published as The Letters of Tomás Herrán and the Panama Crisis, 1900–1903, edited by Thomas J. Dodd, Jr.

References

External links
 Acquisition of the Panama Canal - Historical Text Archive

1843 births
1904 deaths
Georgetown University alumni
Philodemic Society members
Colombian expatriates in the United States